The men's Mistral competition at the 2014 Asian Games in Incheon was held from 24 to 30 September 2014.

Schedule
All times are Korea Standard Time (UTC+09:00)

Results

References

Results

External links
Official website

Men's Mistral